The Tour Championship (stylized as the TOUR Championship) is a golf tournament that is part of the PGA Tour. It has historically been one of the final events of the PGA Tour season; prior to 2007, its field consisted exclusively of the top 30 money leaders of the past PGA Tour season.

Starting in 2007, it was the final event of the four-tournament FedEx Cup Playoffs, with eligibility determined by FedEx Cup points accumulated throughout the season. From 2019 onward, the FedEx Cup was reduced to three events, and the Tour Championship is now held in late August rather than mid-September.

While originally followed by the PGA Tour Fall Series (for those competing for qualifying exemptions in the following season), a re-alignment of the PGA Tour's season schedule in 2013 made the Tour Championship the final event of the season.

From 1987 to 1996, several courses hosted the event. Beginning in 1997, the event alternated between Champions Golf Club in Houston and East Lake Golf Club in Atlanta; since 2004, East Lake has been the event's permanent home.

Format: 1987–2006
From its debut in 1987 through 2006, the top 30 money winners on the PGA Tour after the penultimate event qualified for the event. It took place in early November, the week after the comparable event in Europe, the Volvo Masters, which allowed players who are members of both the PGA Tour and the European Tour to play in both end of season events. After the Tour Championship, the money list for the season was finalized. There were a number of additional events between the Tour Championship and Christmas which were recognized by the PGA Tour, but prize money won in them was unofficial. Also, because this tournament's field was not as large as other golf tournaments, there was no 36-hole cut; all players who started the event were credited with making the cut and received some prize money.

Format: 2007–2018

In 2007, the Tour Championship moved from November to mid-September, where it ended the four-tournament FedEx Cup Playoffs. As in past years, 30 players qualified for the event, but the basis for qualification was no longer prize money. Instead, FedEx Cup points accumulated during the regular PGA Tour season and then during the three preceding playoff events determined the participants. Beginning in 2009, the assignment and awarding of points assured that if any of the top five FedEx Cup point leaders entering The Tour Championship won the event, that player would also won the FedEx Cup. Therefore, it still remained possible for one player to win the Tour Championship and another player to win the FedEx Cup. For example, Tiger Woods won the 2018 Tour Championship but finished second in the FedEx Cup, while Justin Rose won the FedEx Cup despite finishing the tournament tied for fourth, because Woods entered the Tour Championship 20th in overall points while Rose was 2nd.

2007 was also the inaugural year for the Tour's Fall Series, which determined the rest of the top 125 players eligible for the following year's FedEx Cup, which made the event no longer the final tournament of the season. However, starting in 2013, the Tour Championship was the final tournament of the PGA Tour season; seasons begin in October of the previous calendar year. Since 2007, those who qualified for the Tour Championship earned a Masters Tournament invitation.  For 2020, players who qualify for the Tour Championship will be invited to the Sentry Tournament of Champions, a byproduct of tournament cancellations from the coronavirus pandemic.

Prior to 2016, hole 18 at East Lake Golf Club was a par 3, which had been criticized as lacking drama for fans. Starting in 2016, the PGA Tour reversed the nines at East Lake for the Tour Championship so that play now finishes on a more exciting par 5 hole.

Format: 2019–present
Beginning in 2019, the tournament adopted a new format in order to ensure that the winner would also be the FedEx Cup champion.  Using a method similar to the Gundersen method in Nordic combined, the player with the most FedEx Cup points leading into the tournament starts at 10 under par. The player with the second most points starts at −8, the third at −7, and so on down to the fifth at −5. Players ranked 6 through 10 begin at −4; 11 through 15 at −3; and so on, down to numbers 26 to 30 who will start at even par.

For purposes of the Official World Golf Ranking only aggregate scores are taken into account, disregarding any starting scores in relation to par.

Calamity Jane trophy
The Calamity Jane is a sterling silver replica of Bobby Jones's original "Calamity Jane" putter, that has been presented to the winner of the Tour Championship since 2005. In 2017, it was made the official trophy for the tournament. Each winner before 2005 has been awarded one retroactively.

Winner's exemption reward
From 1998 to 2018, the Tour Championship winner, if not already exempt by other means, received a 3-year PGA Tour exemption. Since 2019, the Tour Championship winner has been directly awarded the FedEx Cup and a 5-year PGA Tour exemption.

Tournament hosts

Winners

Notes

References

External links
Coverage on the PGA Tour's official site
Tour Championship Overview and Past Results - Includes past winners and runners-up of tournament from 1987 to 2010
East Lake Golf Club official site
The FedEx Cup home page on the PGA Tour's official site

PGA Tour events
FedEx Cup
Golf in Georgia (U.S. state)
Golf in California
Golf in Texas
Golf in Oklahoma
Golf in North Carolina
Golf in South Carolina
Sports competitions in Atlanta
1987 establishments in Texas